Jan Žemlík (born 9 October 1977 in the Czech Republic) is a retired footballer.

External links
 Profile at iDNES.cz
 Soccerterminal.com Stats

1977 births
Living people
Association football forwards
Czech footballers
Czech expatriate footballers
Dundee F.C. players
Czech First League players
FK Chmel Blšany players
MŠK Žilina players
FC Senec players
FC Baník Prievidza players
FC Fastav Zlín players
Slovak Super Liga players
Scottish Professional Football League players
Expatriate footballers in Slovakia
Expatriate footballers in Scotland
Expatriate footballers in Vietnam
Expatriate footballers in Poland
Czech expatriate sportspeople in Poland
Czech expatriate sportspeople in Vietnam
Czech expatriate sportspeople in Scotland
Czech expatriate sportspeople in Slovakia
Sportspeople from Příbram